Frederick Reginald Ironside (born February 12, 1950), known as Michael Ironside, is a Canadian actor, producer, director, and screenwriter. He is known for playing villains and "tough guy" heroes, but has also portrayed sympathetic characters.

Early life
Ironside was born in Toronto, Ontario, the son of Robert Walter Ironside and Patricia June Ironside ( Passmore). His father was a street lighting technician and laborer and his mother a housewife. He is of English, Irish and Scottish descent, and is one of five children. Ironside attended the Ontario College of Art in Toronto and at age 15 wrote a play, The Shelter, which won the first prize in a university contest. He also won the Senior writing award at Riverdale Collegiate Institute in 1968.

Career
Ironside specializes in playing villains and tough guys. One of his first roles was as evil telepath Darryl Revok in Scanners (1981), an early film by David Cronenberg. He played the role of a serial killer, Colt Hawker, in the 1982 slasher film Visiting Hours, directed by Jean-Claude Lord, and appeared as Miler Crane in The A-Team episode "Taxicab Wars" (1983).

His breakthrough role was as cynical anti-hero Ham Tyler in the television miniseries V: The Final Battle and its following 19-episode series (1984). He is also known for his roles in Top Gun (1986) as Naval Aviator Lieutenant Commander Rick "Jester" Heatherly, Extreme Prejudice (1987) as Major Paul Hackett, Watchers (1988) as a conscience-free mutant assassin, and Total Recall (1990) as Richter, the murderous henchman of Ronny Cox's villain Cohaagen. Ironside played the villainous General Katana in the science fiction sequel Highlander II: The Quickening (1991) and, after a brief stint in ER'''s inaugural season, he was tapped to replace Roy Scheider as captain of the high-tech submarine seaQuest in the third season of seaQuest DSV as Captain Oliver Hudson. However, NBC cancelled the series after only thirteen episodes with Ironside as the star. In 1992, he starred as M. Emmet Walsh's brother in David Winning's thriller Killer Image. In 1994, Ironside starred as Luck Hatcher in the western Dead Man's Revenge. In 1995, Ironside had a brief cameo as Lt. Col. Stone in Major Payne. In 1997, Ironside was reunited with Total Recall director Paul Verhoeven for Starship Troopers. He appeared in The Perfect Storm (2000) and The Machinist (2004). He starred in the film Chaindance as a small-time crook, unable to make it on the outside, who was paired up with a disabled man. Ironside starred as Resistance General Hugh Ashdown in Terminator Salvation, reunited with his co-star from The Machinist, Christian Bale.

He voiced comic book villain Darkseid in the DC Animated Universe, specifically Superman: The Animated Series, Justice League and Justice League Unlimited, and reprised the role in 2020 the DC Universe/HBO Max web series Harley Quinn. Ironside's performance as Darkseid was met with wide critical acclaim, with some comparing the impact it had on the character to that of Mark Hamill's voice performance as the Joker. In one episode of The New Batman Adventures, he voiced Batman in a Batman: The Dark Knight Returns sequence. Another part he played in the DC Comics universe was Lois Lane's father, General Sam Lane in three episodes of Smallville.He has worked in video games as the voice of Tom Clancy's character Sam Fisher in the Splinter Cell games and is cast as the Global Defense Initiative's Lieutenant General Jack Granger in Command & Conquer 3: Tiberium Wars. Ironside signed a five-year deal to portray Captain Jonas Trager in the SpaceWorks Television science fiction series, Ice Planet but the show was not produced.

In 2009, he starred in The Beacon under the direction of Michael Stokes.

In 2010, Ironside guest starred in season 4, episode 1 ("Friends and Enemies") of Burn Notice.

In 2011, Ironside appeared in the film: X-Men: First Class, playing the Captain of the 7th Fleet. He appeared in Justified playing a supporting role as a Detroit hitman the following year. He also voiced the role of Ultra Magnus in season 3 of the Transformers Prime Beast Hunters television series in 2013.

Ironside appeared in the TV series Walker, Texas Ranger as 'The Chairman'.

In 2015, he appeared in the television series The Flash as Lewis Snart, the father of Captain Cold. Also in 2015, he starred as the main villain Zeus in the cult hit film Turbo Kid.

In 2016, he portrayed General Douglas MacArthur in the 4-part miniseries Tokyo Trial.

In 2018, he played J. P. Morgan in 4 episodes of TNT's The Alienist.

In 2021, he portrayed Eddie Williams, the father-in-law and boss of Hutch Mansell in the film, Nobody. 

In 2022, he played Don Lucas in the Hulu miniseries The Dropout''.

Personal life
Ironside has a daughter from a previous marriage and another, born 1998, with his wife.

He has survived thyroid, bowel and prostate cancer.

Filmography

References

External links

1950 births
20th-century Canadian male actors
21st-century Canadian male actors
Living people
Canadian male film actors
Canadian male television actors
Canadian male video game actors
Canadian male voice actors
Canadian people of English descent
Canadian people of Irish descent
Canadian people of Scottish descent
Male actors from Toronto
OCAD University alumni